The Bismarck Event Center (formerly Bismarck Civic Center) is a 10,100-seat multi-purpose facility located in Bismarck, North Dakota. It was known as the Bismarck Civic Center until September 2014. Ritterbush Brothers received an Award of Merit for the design from AIA North Dakota in 1970.

The land was purchased from the Wachter family of Bismarck, who also donated land for parking lots adjacent to the civic center. The Wachters then developed the adjacent Kirkwood Mall on their land south of the arena.

It was the home of the Dakota Wizards of the Continental Basketball Association and NBA Development League.  It also hosted the 2002 Ford World Men's Curling Championship.  For several years, the Professional Bull Riders (PBR) has hosted a Touring Pro Division (minor-league division, formerly known as the Challenger Tour) event at the Civic Center; in 2004, it was voted as the top PBR Challenger Tour venue.

In 2017, the event center became the home to a new professional indoor football team in Champions Indoor Football called the Bismarck Bucks. The Bucks joined the Indoor Football League for the 2019 season.

References

External links
Bismarck Civic Center website

Convention centers in North Dakota
Sports venues in North Dakota
Defunct NBA G League venues
Dakota Wizards
Buildings and structures in Bismarck, North Dakota
Tourist attractions in Bismarck, North Dakota
Continental Basketball Association venues
Rodeo venues in the United States
Basketball venues in North Dakota
Indoor arenas in North Dakota
1969 establishments in North Dakota
Sports venues completed in 1969